Dual specificity tyrosine-phosphorylation-regulated kinase 3 is an enzyme that in humans is encoded by the DYRK3 gene.

This gene product belongs to the DYRK family of dual-specificity protein kinases that catalyze autophosphorylation on serine/threonine and tyrosine residues. The members of this family share structural similarity, however, differ in their substrate specificity, suggesting their involvement in different cellular functions. The encoded protein has been shown to autophosphorylate on tyrosine residue and catalyze phosphorylation of histones H3 and H2B in vitro. Alternatively spliced transcript variants encoding different isoforms have been identified.

See also
DYRK1A
DYRK1B
DYRK2

References

Further reading